is a former Japanese football player. She played for Japan national team.

Club career
Sakata was born in Ozu, Kumamoto on 18 October 1971. After graduating from high school, she joined for Nissan FC in 1990. However, the club was disbanded end of 1993 season. She moved to Prima Ham FC Kunoichi. She retired end of 1996 season. In 1999, she came back at Tasaki Perule FC and she played until 2002 season.

National team career
In December 1989, when Sakata was 18 years old, she was selected Japan national team for 1989 AFC Championship. At this competition, on 24 December, she debuted against Nepal. She was a member of Japan for 1991 and 1995 World Cup. She also played at 1990 Asian Games, 1991, 1993 and 1995 AFC Championship. She played 10 games for Japan until 1996.

National team statistics

References

External links 
 

1971 births
Living people
Nippon Sport Science University alumni
Association football people from Kumamoto Prefecture
Japanese women's footballers
Japan women's international footballers
Nadeshiko League players
Nissan FC Ladies players
Iga FC Kunoichi players
Tasaki Perule FC players
Asian Games medalists in football
Footballers at the 1990 Asian Games
1991 FIFA Women's World Cup players
1995 FIFA Women's World Cup players
Women's association football goalkeepers
Asian Games silver medalists for Japan
Medalists at the 1990 Asian Games